Darsawan is a village in Asoha block of Unnao district, Uttar Pradesh, India. It is not connected to major district roads and has two primary schools and two medical practitioners. As of 2011, its population is 3,074, in 600 households.

The 1961 census recorded Darsawan as comprising 7 hamlets, with a total population of 1,331 (697 male and 634 female), in 272 households and 228 physical houses. The area of the village was given as 1,981 acres. The village had 1 grain mill at the time.

References

Villages in Unnao district